Furio Camillo is an underground station on Linea A of the Rome Metro. The station was inaugurated in 1980 and is located under Via Appia Nuova, at the junction of Via Cesare Baronio and Viale Furio Camillo, in an area where roads are named after personalities from the earliest history of Rome and characters from the Aeneid.

Services
This station has:
 Access for the disabled
 Escalators

Located nearby
Via Appia Nuova
Via Tuscolana
Basilica di Santa Maria Ausiliatrice
Villa Lazzaroni
Villa Lais

References

External links
The station on the ATAC site. 

Rome Metro Line A stations
Railway stations opened in 1980
1980 establishments in Italy
Rome Q. VIII Tuscolano
Rome Q. IX Appio-Latino
Railway stations in Italy opened in the 20th century